Child Maurice or Gil Morrice is Child ballad 83.  The earliest known printed version was in 1755 at Glasgow.

Synopsis
The hero sends tokens to his lady and asks her to see him in the woods.  Her lord learns of it and comes to where he will meet her, and kills him under the impression that he is her paramour.  He brings back the head, and the lady confesses that he was her illegitimate son.  Her lord is deeply grieved and declares he would never have killed him if he had known.

Adaptations
John Home based his tragedy Douglas on it. In 1776, Hannah More wrote a poem "Sir Elfred of the Bower" inspired by the song. The ballad serves as the framework as well as the climax of the book Black is the Colour of my True Love's Heart by Ellis Peters.

Recordings

The James Madison Carpenter Collection has a recording by Peter Christie, from before 1955.
Most of the recorded versions live up to the comment by Robert Burns in a letter dated
September 1793: "It is a plaguy length". Martin Carthy's 2005 version is nine minutes long. the version by Spiers and Boden is over seven minutes, slightly longer than MacColl's 1981 version.

See also
The White Fisher

References

External links
Child Maurice

Child Ballads
Filicide in fiction
Year of song unknown
18th-century ballads